Piveshk Rural District is a rural district (dehestan) in the Lirdaf District of Jask County, Hormozgan Province, Iran. At the 2006 census, its population was 9,749, in 2,277 families.  The rural district has 40 villages.

References 

Rural Districts of Hormozgan Province
Jask County